Cleopas Ncube (born November 21, 1983) is a Canadian wrestler. He finished in 4th place in the 70kg event at the 2014 World Wrestling Championships, losing the bronze medal final to Ali Shabanau of Belarus. He also ranked among the best in several international competitions, including the Dave Schultz International.

References 

1983 births
Anglophone Quebec people
Canadian male sport wrestlers
Living people
Sportspeople from Bulawayo
Zimbabwean emigrants to Canada
Black Canadian sportspeople
Sportspeople from Montreal